Kleindienst is a surname. Notable people with the surname include:

Richard Kleindienst (1923–2000), American lawyer and politician
Thérèse Kleindienst (1916–2018), French librarian, archivist, and palaeograph
Tim Kleindienst (born 1995), German footballer